is a private junior college in Hachioji, Tokyo, Japan. The precursor of the school was founded in 1934, and it was chartered as a university in 1992.

External links 
 

Private universities and colleges in Japan
Educational institutions established in 1934
Japanese junior colleges
Universities and colleges in Tokyo
1934 establishments in Japan
Western Metropolitan Area University Association